Epinotia nigricana is a species of moth belonging to the family Tortricidae.

It is native to Europe. The wingspan is 11–13 mm. The forewings are brown variegated with traces of a bright cross-band in the middle. The hindwings are brown. 

The larva develops between the spun leaves of Abies alba.

References

Eucosmini
Moths described in 1851